Moelis & Company is a global investment bank that provides financial advisory services to corporations, governments, and financial sponsors. The firm advises on strategic decisions such as mergers and acquisitions, recapitalizations and restructurings and other corporate finance matters. Moelis is widely considered one of the most prestigious investment banking advisory firms and has advised on more than $3.5 trillion in transactions since its inception. 

It was founded in 2007 and is headquartered in New York, with 20 offices in North and South America, Europe, the Middle East, Asia and Australia. It has 1078 employees, including 765 investment bankers. Of the 137 managing directors, averaging more than 20 years of experience each, 56 are former sector and product heads.

History 
Moelis was founded in July 2007 by Ken Moelis and partners including Navid Mahmoodzadegan and Jeffrey Raich. The firm opened in New York and Los Angeles, and became a top 10 ranked M&A advisor in the US in its first full year of operations, advising on transactions such as Anheuser-Busch's $61.2 billion sale to InBev, Yahoo's defense from Microsoft's $44.6 billion unsolicited proposal, and Hilton Hotels' $26.5 billion sale to The Blackstone Group.

In July 2008, Moelis opened its restructuring practice by hiring the co-heads of Jefferies' restructuring and advising on the $22.2 billion reorganization of Delphi Automotive, and the $29.6 billion reorganization of AMR Corp and $17.0 billion merger with US Airways Group. Matthew Prest, the restructuring head of European corporate finance firm Close Brothers, soon followed with his team to join Moelis in London. Early European restructuring mandates included the £1.5 billion recapitalization of the Co-operative Bank and the €15.4 billion restructuring of Glitnir.

In June 2009 Mark Aedy joined Moelis as head of EMEA Investment Banking based in the London office. Early mandates in Europe included advising Natixis on the €30.0 billion disposal of most of its complex credit derivative portfolio.

In August 2009 Moelis opened an office in Sydney, Australia, led by a team from JP Morgan. In Australia, Moelis has advised SABMiller on the A$11.7 billion acquisition of Fosters Group, advised a consortium including Deutsche Bank, KKR and Värde Partners on the A$8.2 billion acquisition of GE Capital Australia & New Zealand Consumer Finance, and advised Centro Properties on the A$4.3 billion restructuring and A$5.0 billion merger of Australian interests.

The firm opened a Dubai office in January 2011  while advising the Government of Dubai on the $24.9 billion restructuring of its investment holding company, Dubai World. The firm also expanded into Asia by opening a Hong Kong office.

In January 2012, Moelis announced a strategic alliance agreement with the second largest Japanese bank, SMBC and its subsidiary SMBC Nikko. Together they have advised on significant cross-border M&A, including Osaka Securities Exchange's ¥278.4 billion combination with the Tokyo Stock Exchange.

In March 2014, the firm expanded into South America, opening an office in São Paulo, Brazil.

In April 2014, the firm completed its initial public offering and began trading on the New York Stock Exchange. Moelis had advised on over $1 trillion in transactions by the time of its IPO. Employees maintain ownership of the majority of the company.

In June 2014, Moelis established a private funds advisory business with four hires.

In February 2015, the firm opened its Washington DC office, following the hire of Eric Cantor, former House Majority Leader, in September 2014.

In April 2017, the firm held an initial public offering (IPO) for its Australian business, Moelis Australia.

Global reach 
Moelis operates from 21 offices globally across North and South America, Europe, the Middle East, Asia, and Australia:

  Amsterdam
  Beijing
  Boston
  Chicago
  Dubai
  Frankfurt
  Hong Kong
  Houston
  Japan*
  London
  Los Angeles
  Melbourne
  Mumbai
  New York City
  San Francisco
  Mexico**
  Paris
  São Paulo
  Sydney
  Tel Aviv
  Washington, D.C.

*Strategic Alliance with SMBC and SMBC Nikko
**Strategic Alliance with Alfaro, Dávila & Scherer

See also
 List of investment banks
 Boutique investment bank

References

External links
Official website

Drexel Burnham Lambert
Investment banks in the United States
American companies established in 2007
Financial services companies established in 2007
Banks established in 2007
Companies based in Manhattan
Private equity firms of the United States
2007 establishments in New York City
Companies listed on the New York Stock Exchange
Moelis family